Caroline Powell (born 14 March 1973) is a New Zealand equestrian.  At the 2012 Summer Olympics she won the bronze medal in Team eventing.  She was born in Lower Hutt, New Zealand and lives in Suffolk, East Anglia.

Powell has represented New Zealand in two Olympic Games and two World Games, where she won a bronze team medal in 2010.  Also in 2010, she won the Burghley Horse Trials.

CCI5* Results

International Championship Results

Notable Horses 
 Lenamore - 1993 Gray Irish Sport Horse Gelding (Sea Crest x Valiyar)
 2006 World Equestrian Games - Team Sixth Place, Individual 26th Place
 2008 Beijing Olympics - Team Fifth Place, Individual 16th Place
 2010 Burghley CCI**** Winner
 2012 London Olympics - Team Bronze Medal, Individual 29th Place
 Cathpair High Hopes - 2001 Chestnut Thoroughbred Gelding (Accondy x Royal Fountain)
 2007 FEI Eventing Young Horse World Championships - Eighth Place
 Mac Macdonald - 2000 Chestnut Gelding (Blaze of Gold)
 2010 World Equestrian Games - Team Bronze Medal, Individual 22nd Place

References

External links
 
 

1973 births
Living people
Olympic equestrians of New Zealand
New Zealand female equestrians
Olympic bronze medalists for New Zealand
Equestrians at the 2008 Summer Olympics
Equestrians at the 2012 Summer Olympics
Olympic medalists in equestrian
Medalists at the 2012 Summer Olympics